"Expelled" is a short story by John Cheever published by The New Republic in 1930.
The story appears in a collection of Cheever's short fiction, Thirteen Uncollected Stories by John Cheever, published in 1994 by Academy Chicago Publishers

An autobiographical piece, "Expelled" is Cheever's first published work of fiction.

Plot
The story is written from the first-person point-of-view. Without making it explicit, the unnamed narrator is Cheever. The story begins In medias res. No clearly articulated plot develops.

A student at a prestigious prep school is summarily dismissed from the institution for poor academic performance during his junior year. He reflects upon the nature of his experience at the school, stressing his alienation and disaffection: the restrained analysis of the academic establishment is a covert but powerful indictment of the system.
The narrator provides a number of vignettes of those educators who impressed him because they challenged the school administrators, expressed great enthusiasm for the subjects they taught, or deviated from the socially approved expressions of their personal suffering.

The story ends ambiguously. Now in exile, the former student struggles with the implications of his expulsion, a painful, but liberating right of passage that marks his entry into adulthood.

Publication background
Cheever left the prestigious Thayer Academy in his junior year. The reason for his departure is not perfectly clear, as Cheever himself provided a number of unrelated versions including poor grades, smoking on campus, or homosexual encounters with some of his classmates. 
Reaction to the story came from a number of fronts, not least of which were parents of Thayer students and its faculty, who accused Cheever of "distortions." The school's headmaster, Stacy Baxter Southworth insisted that Cheever "was not expelled" but "left entirely on his own volition." 
In a 1978 interview with John Hersey in The New York Times Book Review, Cheever recalled:

Cheever, in an act of youthful audacity, submitted the work to Malcolm Cowley, editor of the prestigious leftist journal The New Republic. Cowley was so impressed with the story that he waived the magazine's policy of carrying only non-fiction articles, and published "Expelled" in its October 1, 1930, issue.

"Expelled" is the first published work of Cheever's literary career.

Critical assessment
Cheever's academic failure in his junior year served as the genesis for "Expelled", composed when he was 17-years-old. Literary critic Lynne Waldeland observes that "even at the age of sixteen [sic], Cheever showed showed skill at getting beyond the personal vibrations of the experience to a literary presentation of the material." Biographer Scott Donaldson places the author's achievement in a broader context:

Style, theme and atructure
Literary critic George W. Hunt notes the influence of Ernest Hemingway in the opening paragraph of the work:

Commenting on the structure of "Expelled", literary critic Robert Morace called it "very nearly cubist in effect.": "The nonlinear structure has sometimes been misread as a sign of literary apprenticeship rather than understood as characteristic of Cheever's approach, both early and late, to the writing of fiction." Praising Cheever's "stylistic restraint" in "Expelled", literary critic Patrick Meanor reports that "the narrative voice is never strident." Meanor cites this passage of the story to illustrate the point:

Literary critic James E. O'Hara quotes a passage from the story to illustrate Cheever's contempt and alienation from Thayer Academy and the prep school establishment:

Donaldson adds: "In 999 cases out of a thousand, such a submission would have turned into a political harangue and been rejected without a second glance. But Cheever's tale was different...it caught Cowley's attention and held it."

Remarking on work's key thematic element, Patrick Meanor regards "Expelled" as "the first example of the single most important thematic element pattern" in Cheever's work, "the fall" from innocence, and adding this seminal story "marked the first of Cheever's outcast or the exile, a character type that surfaces throughout his fiction."

Footnotes

Sources 
Bailey, Blake. 2009. Notes on Text in John Cheever: Collected Stories and Other Writing. The Library of America. Pp. 1025-1028 
Cheever, John. 1994. The Uncollected Stories of John Cheever. Edited by Franklin H. Dennis. Academy Chicago Publishers, Chicago. 
Cheever, John. 2009. John Cheever: Collected Stories and Other Writing. The Library of America. 
Coale, Samuel. 1977. John Cheever. Frederick Ungar Publishing Company, New York. 
Donaldson, Scott. 1988. John Cheever: A Biography. Random House, New York. 
Hunt, George W. 1993. Introduction to Thirteen Uncollected Works by John Cheever. Chicago Academy Publishers. 
Meanor, Patrick. 1995. John Cheever Revisited. Twayne Publishers, New York. 
O'Hara, James E. 1989. John Cheever: A Study of the Short Fiction. Twayne Publishers, Boston Massachusetts. Twayne Studies in Short Fiction no 9. 
Waldeland, Lynne. 1979. John Cheever. Twayne Publishers, G. K. Hall & Company, Boston, Massachusetts. 

1930 short stories
American short stories
Short stories by John Cheever
Works originally published in The New Republic
Autobiographical short stories
First-person narrative fiction